Đỗ Thị Minh (born August 3, 1988) is a retired Vietnamese volleyball player, and a former member of the Vietnam women's national volleyball team.

Career
Minh played the 2013/14 season with the Thai club Idea Khonkaen.

Clubs
  Thông tin LVPB (2002–2017, 2018-2020)
  Idea Khonkaen (2013–2014)

Awards

Individual 
 2010 VTV International Cup "Most Valuable Player"

Clubs
 2005 Vietnam League -  Champion, with Thông tin Liên Việt Post Bank
 2006 Vietnam League -  Champion, with Thông tin Liên Việt Post Bank
 2008 Vietnam League -  Champion, with Thông tin Liên Việt Post Bank
 2009 Vietnam League -  Runner-Up, with Thông tin Liên Việt Post Bank
 2010 Vietnam League -  Champion, with Thông tin Liên Việt Post Bank
 2011 Vietnam League -  Runner-Up, with Thông tin Liên Việt Post Bank
 2012 Vietnam League -  Champion, with Thông tin Liên Việt Post Bank
 2013 Vietnam League -  Champion, with Thông tin Liên Việt Post Bank
 2014 Vietnam League -  Champion, with Thông tin Liên Việt Post Bank
 2015 Vietnam League -  Champion, with Thông tin Liên Việt Post Bank
 2016 Vietnam League -  Runner-Up, with Thông tin Liên Việt Post Bank
 2018 Vietnam League -  Runner-Up, with Thông tin Liên Việt Post Bank
 2019 Vietnam League -  Champion, with Thông tin Liên Việt Post Bank
 2020 Vietnam League -  Champion, with Thông tin Liên Việt Post Bank

References

Vietnamese women's volleyball players
1988 births
Living people
Vietnamese expatriate sportspeople in Thailand
People from Hà Nam Province
Vietnam women's international volleyball players
Southeast Asian Games silver medalists for Vietnam
Southeast Asian Games medalists in volleyball
Competitors at the 2009 Southeast Asian Games
Outside hitters
21st-century Vietnamese women